Jeffrey Gitelman (born February 5, 1982) is a Grammy-nominated record producer, musician and songwriter from Chișinău, Moldova. He is known for his work with the band The Stepkids, which formed in 2010. He is also known for his composition, production, and instrumentation for J. Cole, H.E.R., Jennifer Lopez, Mac Miller and Anderson .Paak. He was nominated for a Grammy Award for Album of the Year for his work on H.E.R.'s 2019 album I Used to Know Her.

Early life
Jeff Gitelman was born on February 5, 1982, to a Jewish family in Soviet-ruled Moldavia. He and his family emigrated from Chișinău, Moldova in 1991 and moved to New Haven, Connecticut. His interest in music developed in his early childhood when he found a guitar in a trash can and his father fixed it for him. He subsequently learned how to speak English through listening to and learning how to play Western music, notably The Beatles.

Music career

Performing
Gitelman's music career began while attending Amity Regional High School. After graduating from Amity, he attended Berklee College of Music in Boston, Massachusetts. His first professional job was recording and touring with Lauryn Hill, which led to Gitelman being hired as a touring guitarist for Alicia Keys, as well as performances with Stevie Wonder, David Bowie, Chance the Rapper and others.

The Stepkids
In 2010, Gitelman, along with Tim Walsh and Dan Edinberg formed The Stepkids, a psychedelic soul band. They released their debut self-titled album The Stepkids (album) in 2011 under Stones Throw Records. The band toured and collaborated with Kimbra, Mayer Hawthorne and Aloe Blacc.

Independent work and Production
Following his work with The Stepkids, Gitelman relocated to Los Angeles, California, to focus on production. His guitar, production, composition, and writing is featured on J. Cole's 2014 Forest Hills Drive, H.E.R.'s I Used to Know Her, Anderson .Paak's Oxnard, Donnie Trumpet's Surf, Mac Miller's Swimming and The Divine Feminine, ASAP Ferg's Always Strive and Prosper, as well as work with Camila Cabello, Ty Dolla $ign, Jeremih, Kid Ink, Trey Songz, Rick Ross, and others.

Education
Gitelman has worked in music education, serving on the Panel of Music Industry Advisors at the 2015 Grammy Camp in Los Angeles, and conducting lectures and seminars on composition, production, music business, and performance to young musicians throughout the USA. In 2005, Gitelman co-founded the American Roots Music program, an initiative to teach young adults grades one through twelve the history of American music through performance and lecture. In 2015, Gitelman was inducted into his alma mater Amity High School's hall of fame.

In 2016, Gitelman founded the Duality School of Music, that began programming during the Fall 2017 semester at Amity High School in Woodbridge, Connecticut.

Discography

With The Stepkids
 The Stepkids (2011)
 Direct To Disc – Stones Throw Records Live Album (2012)
 Troubadour (2013)
 Wanderers EP (2011)

Solo work
 "Karaoke" ft. Trinidad James (2018)
 "Stranger Than Fiction" (2017)

Production, composition, and writing discography

2022
The Weeknd - Dawn FM
6. "A Tale By Quincy"

2021
Jorja Smith - Be Right Back
3. "Bussdown" (feat. Shaybo)
6. "Burn"

2020
 Alina Baraz - It Was Divine
 8. "Night And Morning"
 14. "Be Good"
 15. "Until I Met You (feat. Nas)"

 Kelly Clarkson
 1. "I Dare You"

KSI – Dissimulation

 1. "What You Been On"

 Mac Miller – Circles
 13. "Right"

Chloe x Halle – Ungodly Hour
 7. "Busy Boy"
 11. "Don't Make It Harder on Me"

Usher 
 1. "I Cry"

2019

 Allen Stone
 "Sweaters"

 Boogie – Everythings for Sale
 01. "Tired/Reflections"

 Brandy
 "Freedom Rings"

 Childish Major – Dirt Road Diamond
 01. "Necessary Pressure"
 02. "To My Little Homies"
 04. "For You"

 Dinah Jane
 "SZNS" ft. A Boogie wit da Hoodie

 Gallant – Sweet Insomnia
 11. "Sleep On It"

 H.E.R. – I Used to Know Her
 01. "Lost Souls" ft. DJ Scratch
 06. "Can't Help Me"
 08. "Feel A Way"
 09. "21"
 10. "Racks" ft. YBN Cordae
 15. "Take You There"
 16. "As I Am"

 JoJo
 "Joanna"

 SiR – Chasing Summer
 02. "John Redcorn"

 Terrace Martin
 "Intimidated"

2018

 Anderson .Paak – Oxnard
 03. "Tints" 

 Camila Cabello – Camila
 02. "All These Years"

 Chic – It's About Time
 TBA. "Till the World Falls" 

 Jacob Banks – Village
 04. "Prosecco"

 Mac Miller – Swimming
 01. "Come Back to Earth"
 07. "Ladders"

 Nao – Saturn
 10. "Drive and Disconnect"

2017
 Trey Songz – Tremaine the Album 
 08. "She Lovin It"

 Jeremih 
 "Think of You" (ft. Chris Brown & Big Sean)

 Rick Ross – Rather You Than Me 
 10. "Scientology" (composition)

2016
 Mac Miller – The Divine Feminine
 05. "Cinderella" (ft. Ty Dolla Sign)

 A$AP Ferg – Always Strive and Prosper
 01. "Rebirth"
 05. "Psycho"

2015
 Donnie Trumpet & The Social Experiment – Surf
 01. "Miracle"
 02. "Slip Slide" 
 03. "Warm Enough" 
 05. "Wanna Be Cool"
 10. "SmthnthtIwnt"
 11. "Go"

 Karmin – Leo Rising
 07. "Along the Road"

 Logic – The Incredible True Story
 18. "The Incredible True Story"

 Outasight – Big Trouble

2014
 Pharoahe Monch – PTSD
 16. "Eht Dnarg Noisulli"

2011
 Jennifer Hudson – I Remember Me
 guitar

2009
 Alicia Keys – The Element of Freedom
 guitar

Awards and nominations 

!
|-
|align=center|2020
|I Used to Know Her
|Grammy Award for Album of the Year
|
|
|-

References

1982 births
21st-century guitarists
Hip hop record producers
Moldovan guitarists
Living people
Moldovan emigrants to the United States
Musicians from Chișinău
Moldovan Jews
American people of Moldovan-Jewish descent